Bantowbol or bantubol is a style of music from Cameroon. The genre is derived from Cameroonian folk music. The name bantowbol is partially derived from bal, a term for accordion playing. The principal musicians of bantowbol are Gibraltar Drakus and Nkondo Si Tony.

References
 Nkolo, Jean-Victor, and Graeme Ewens (2000). "Cameroon: Music of a Small Continent". World Music, Volume 1: Africa, Europe and the Middle East. London: Rough Guides Ltd., p. 445.

Cameroonian styles of music